Eugenia Crittenden Blackburn "Crit" Luallen (born July 21, 1952) is an American politician who served as the 56th lieutenant governor of Kentucky from November 13, 2014, to December 8, 2015. Luallen previously served as Kentucky State Auditor.

Early life and career
Luallen is a native of Frankfort, where she graduated from Frankfort High School before continuing on to study at Centre College in Danville, Kentucky, graduating in 1974. Luallen is descended from John Jordan Crittenden and Luke Pryor Blackburn, and she shares her name with both men. After graduating from Centre College, Luallen began working in the mailroom of Wendell Ford's senate campaign. She worked her way up in the campaign to working in communications. After Ford's campaign, Luallen worked on Julian Carroll's gubernatorial campaign and in the administration of John Y. Brown Jr.

In 1983, Luallen worked on Martha Layne Collins's gubernatorial campaign as the campaign media coordinator. She served in the Collins administration as a special assistant and was later appointed Commissioner of the Kentucky Department of the Arts. As Commissioner of the Arts, Luallen helped found the Kentucky Governor's School for the Arts. After Governor Collins left office in 1988, Luallen took a position working with the Greater Louisville Economic Development Partnership, a position she retained until 1992. Luallen returned to government in 1992 after taking the position of Secretary of the Kentucky Tourism Cabinet, a position she held until 1994. From 1994 to 1995, Luallen served as Secretary of the Finance and Administration Cabinet. In 1995, Paul E. Patton was elected Governor and Luallen served as Secretary of the Executive Cabinet until 2002. Luallen received attention during her tenure under Governor Patton, especially for helping negotiate a 1997 tax incentive package for the United Parcel Service, during the 2000 tax reforms, and for her role in the 1997 higher education reforms.

Kentucky Auditor
She was elected to the position of state auditor in November 2003 and was re-elected by a wide margin in the 2007 Kentucky State Elections. Luallen was not eligible to run for another term as Auditor in 2011. As Auditor, Luallen received near-universal praise, "uncovering millions of dollars in fraud—sending up a then-unheard-of 120 cases to law enforcement." She was seen as "a non-partisan figure whose work resulted in the prosecution of 34 public officials, many from her own party." On Luallen's willingness as state auditor to search out crime, Assistant U.S. Attorney Ken Taylor commented, "I am very impressed with that office under her. They have the right attitude about being a watchdog." During her tenure as Auditor, Luallen successfully battled colon cancer and another unspecified cancer in 2004 and 2005.

Luallen was considered a top contender for the Democratic nomination to challenge Senator Mitch McConnell in the 2008 Election before announcing her decision not to run but instead to remain as Auditor. In December 2011, Luallen said "At this stage in my career, I think the next race for me if I decide to run for statewide race would be for governor", and ruled out running against McConnell in 2014. In April 2014, she ruled out running for Governor in 2015.

Lieutenant Governor of Kentucky
On November 6, 2014, Governor Steve Beshear appointed Luallen Lieutenant Governor of Kentucky, effective November 13, 2014. Luallen completed the term of Jerry Abramson who was appointed Deputy Assistant to the President and Director of Intergovernmental Affairs by President Barack Obama.

Honors
1994- Centre College Distinguished Alumni induction
2001- National Excellence in Leadership award from Women Executives in State Government
2009- Public Officials of the Year honoree from Governing
2012- Fontaine Banks Award for Distinguished Service from Bluegrass Council of the Boy Scouts of America
2012- Martha Layne Collins award from  Women Leading Kentucky
2012- Honorary degree from Spalding University
2012- Kentucky Women Remembered induction
2015- Louisville Business First Enterprising Woman of Achievement

See also
List of female lieutenant governors in the United States

References

External links
 Office of the Lieutenant Governor of Kentucky
 

1952 births
American Disciples of Christ
Centre College alumni
Crittenden family
Kentucky Democrats
Lieutenant Governors of Kentucky
Living people
Politicians from Frankfort, Kentucky
State Auditors of Kentucky
State cabinet secretaries of Kentucky
People from Franklin County, Kentucky
Women in Kentucky politics